Jukka Hartonen (born 14 March 1969 in Kiihtelysvaara) is a Finnish cross-country skier who competed from 1991 to 1998 and again from 2006 to present day. His best World Cup finish was fifth in a 15 km event at Lahti in 1995.

Hartonen also finished 13th in the 30 km event at the 1994 Winter Olympics in Lillehammer. His best finish at the FIS Nordic World Ski Championships was 14th in the 50 km event at Falun in 1993.

Hartonen is also active in triathlon and running races.

Cross-country skiing results
All results are sourced from the International Ski Federation (FIS).

Olympic Games

World Championships

World Cup

Season standings

Team podiums
 3 podiums

References

External links

1969 births
Cross-country skiers at the 1992 Winter Olympics
Cross-country skiers at the 1994 Winter Olympics
Finnish male cross-country skiers
Living people
Olympic cross-country skiers of Finland
People from Kiihtelysvaara
Sportspeople from North Karelia
20th-century Finnish people